Devnimori, or Devni Mori, is a Buddhist archaeological site in northern Gujarat, about  from the city of Shamlaji, in the Aravalli District of northern Gujarat, India. The site is variously dated to the 3rd century or 4th century CE, or circa 400 CE. Its location was associated with trade routes and caravans in the area of Gujarat. Site excavations have yielded Buddhist artifacts dated prior to 8th-century in the lowest layer, mixed Buddhist and Hindu artwork from the Gurjara-Pratihara period in the middle, topped by Muslim glazed ware attributed to the 14th century. The site was excavated between 1960 and 1963. The site became flooded by the Meswo reservoir, a project started in 1959 and completed over 1971–1972 over the nearby Meshwo River.

Archaeological finds

Buddhist sculptures
The site of Devni Mori included numerous terracotta  Buddhist sculptures (but no stone sculptures), also dated to the 3rd-4th century CE, and which are among the earliest sculptures that can be found in Gujarat. The remains are located in the Shamlaji Museum and Baroda Museum & Picture Gallery.

Viharas

Devni Mori has a specific construction pattern for a monastery, with an image shrine built opposite the entrance. This kind of arrangement was initiated in northwestern sites such as  Kalawan (in the Taxila area) or Dharmarajika. It is thought that this architectural pattern then became the prototype for the later development of monasteries with shrines in Devni Mori, Ajanta, Aurangabad, Ellora, Nalanda, Ratnagiri, Odisha and others. The viharas in Devni Mori were built from fired bricks.

Devni Mori also has residential caves with water cisterns, as at Uparkot in Junagadh.

Stupa
Devni Mori also has a stupa where stacked relic deposits were found. This is the only case of a free-standing stupa in the area of Gujarat. Nine images of the Buddha were found inside the stupa. The Buddha images clearly show the influence of the Greco-Buddhist art of Gandhara, and have been described as examples of the Western Indian art of the Western Satraps.

Dates and influences

Three relics caskets were retrieved from the stupa. One of these caskets bears an inscription which mentions a date: the 127th year in the reign of Western Satrap ruler Rudrasena:

As Western Satraps dated their coins in the Saka era, this date would be 204 CE, and the ruler would be Rudrasena I. If reckoned with the Kalachuri Era, the date would be 375 CE, and the ruler Rudrasena III.

A second casket included 8 coins of Western Satraps rulers, one of them being a coin of Western Satrap ruler Visvasena (294-305). The coins are worn, but the coins of two other rulers have been found in the group: one coin of Rudrasena I (203-220 CE) and a nearly unworn coin of Rudrasimha (305-313 CE). Overall, and because of these different dates, the site of Devni Mori is sometimes dated to the 3rd century, and sometimes to the 4th century. The absence of later Western Satraps coins and the various dates could however suggest that the stupa was rebuilt at one point, with a final construction date not long after 305–313.

According to Mehta and Chawdhary, the art of Devni Mori prove the existence of a pre-Gupta era Western Indian artistic tradition. This tradition, they suggest may have influenced the art of the Ajanta Caves, Sarnath and other places from the 5th century onward. As a matter of fact, Devni Mori represents the extension of Gandharan influence to the subcontinent, which persisted locally with the sites of Mīrpur Khās, Śāmalājī or Dhānk, a century before this influence would further extend to Ajanta and Sarnath.

Shah disagrees and states that instead of this "so-called pre-Gupta influence", the Gandhara arts influenced these, while Gupta art was influenced by the pre-Gupta era Western tradition. According to Schastok, the significance of the finding here is that there were multiple centers involved. According to Williams, it is difficult to accept either these theories because "any number of the features had been in use too long to have chronological significance" and the Western Indian tradition could very well have been a combination of local innovation combined with influences from the Mathura school.

Gallery

See also
Kahu-Jo-Darro

References

Sources

External links
Gujarat tourism - Devni Mori 

Cities and towns in Aravalli district
Stupas in India
Buddhist monasteries in India
Buddhist sites in Gujarat